Barbarea balcana, the Balkan yellow rocket, is a perennial herb of the genus Barbarea from the family Brassicaceae that grows in wet spring areas.

References

balcana
Flora of Europe
Plants described in 1888